Budh Planitia is a large plain on Mercury. It lies to the east of Odin Planitia. It falls within the Tolstoj quadrangle. It was named after the Hindu word for Mercury, Budha, in 1976.

There are no major craters within Budh Planitia.  It lies to the north of the large crater Phidias, and to the south of Couperin.

References

Surface features of Mercury